HMNZS Kiwi (T102) was a Bird class minesweeper of the Royal New Zealand Navy.

She was commissioned in 1941 for minesweeping and anti-submarine roles. From 1948 to 1956 she functioned as a training ship.

On 29 January 1943, with her sister ship Moa, Kiwi rammed and wrecked the Japanese submarine I-1. At the time Kiwi was under the command of Lieutenant Commander Gordon Bridson who was awarded the DSC and the United States Navy Cross for this action.

Kiwi was the first vessel with this name to serve in the Royal New Zealand Navy and is named after the national bird of New Zealand.

See also
Minesweepers of the Royal New Zealand Navy

Notes

References
McDougall, R J  (1989) New Zealand Naval Vessels. Page 59–61. Government Printing Office.

Further reading
Harker, Jack (2000)The Rockies: New Zealand Minesweepers at War. Silver Owl Press.

External links
Royal NZ Navy's Bird-class ships New Zealand Ministry for Culture and Heritage. Updated 20 December 2012.
Photo of HMNZS Kiwi's company
Photo of damage to the bow of Kiwi

World War II minesweepers of New Zealand
Minesweepers of the Royal New Zealand Navy
Training ships of the Royal New Zealand Navy